Ziv Television Programs, Inc. was an American production company that specialized in productions for first-run television syndication in the 1950s.

History 
The company was founded by Frederick Ziv in 1948 and was a subsidiary of his successful radio syndication business, which had begun in 1937. The company produced recorded programs and sold them directly to local television stations. The television syndication service proved lucrative during the late 1940s and early 1950s, as local television stations wanted to fill their schedules during hours outside of "prime time". By 1955, Ziv was producing more than 250 half-hour TV episodes a year.

As the Big Three television networks began offering programs outside of prime time, Ziv's popularity and business began to decline. The market for first-run syndicated television programming began to dwindle, and the company,  to attempt to save its business, began to produce programs which aired over the networks in 1956. In 1960, the company was purchased by United Artists and merged with their television unit to become Ziv-United Artists, but two years later, the name changed back to United Artists Television after the TV studio phased out Ziv Television Programs' operations.

Today, most of the rights to Ziv's TV shows are distributed by MGM Television and SFM Entertainment, while some of them have fallen into the public domain.

ZIV International, on the other hand, was established as an unrelated production company and distributor of Americanized anime shows in the 1970s and 1980s. This company was linked to this former organization only by the similarity of its name.

Selected list of shows produced or distributed
 Acapulco ZIV-UA, 1961, starring Ralph Taeger & James Coburn (a brief reworking of Klondike)
 Bat Masterson ZIV-UA, 1958–1961, starring Gene Barry
 Bold Venture ZIV, 1959–1960, starring Dane Clark and Joan Marshall (adapted from Ziv's 1950–1952 radio program starring Humphrey Bogart and Lauren Bacall)
 Boston Blackie ZIV, 1951–1953, starring Kent Taylor (adapted from Ziv's earlier radio version)
 Dial 999 ZIV, 1958–1959, starring Robert Beatty (this was a co-production with Britain's ABC, not to be confused with the US ABC). Episodes and cast details can be viewed at ctva.biz/UK/dial999.htm
 Dr. Christian ZIV, 1956–1957, starring MacDonald Carey (a "sequel" to the original 1937–1954 radio series starring Jean Hersholt)
 Easy Aces, ZIV, 1949–1950, starring Goodman Ace and Jane Ace (adapted from their previous radio show)
 The Everglades ZIV-UA-Ivan Tors, 1961–1962, starring Ron Hayes
 Harbor Command ZIV, 1957–1958, starring Wendell Corey
 Harbormaster ZIV, 1957–1958, starring Barry Sullivan & Paul Burke
 Highway Patrol ZIV, 1955–1959, starring Broderick Crawford
 Home Run Derby ZIV, 1959–1960, hosted by Mark Scott
 I Led Three Lives ZIV, 1953–1956, starring Richard Carlson
 Keyhole ZIV-UA, 1962, Semi-documentary series.
 King of Diamonds ZIV-UA, 1961–1962, starring Broderick Crawford
 Klondike ZIV-UA, 1960–1961, starring Ralph Taeger & James Coburn
 Lee Marvin Presents Lawbreaker UATV, 1963–1964, Semi-documentary dramatizations of real cases hosted by Lee Marvin
 Lock-Up ZIV, 1959–1961, starring MacDonald Carey
 Mackenzie's Raiders ZIV, 1958–1959, starring Richard Carlson
 Malibu Run ZIV-United Artists-Ivan Tors starring Jeremy Slate & Ron Ely (reworking of The Aquanauts) 
 The Man Called X ZIV, 1956–1957, starring Barry Sullivan (adapted from the radio series starring Herbert Marshall)
 Martin Kane, Private Investigator ZIV, 1957–1958, starring William Gargan (adapted from the original NBC radio and TV series)
 Meet Corliss Archer ZIV, 1954, starring Ann Baker (adapted from the original CBS radio and earlier TV show)
 Men into Space ZIV-Ivan Tors, 1959–1960, starring William Lundigan
 Men of Annapolis ZIV, 1957–1958, Naval anthology series
 Miami Undercover ZIV-UA, 1961, starring Lee Bowman (produced by Aubrey Schenck and Howard W. Koch)
 Mr. District Attorney ZIV, 1954–1955, starring David Brian (adapted from the original NBC radio and earlier ABC TV series)
 Ripcord ZIV-UA-Ivan Tors, 1961–1963, starring Larry Pennell & Ken Curtis
 Science Fiction Theatre ZIV-Ivan Tors, 1955–1957, anthology series hosted by Truman Bradley
 Sea Hunt ZIV-Ivan Tors, 1958–1961, starring Lloyd Bridges
 Target ZIV, 1957–1958, anthology series hosted by Adolphe Menjou
 The Aquanauts ZIV-UA-Ivan Tors, 1960–1961, starring Keith Larsen, Jeremy Slate, & Ron Ely
 The Case of the Dangerous Robin ZIV, 1960–1961, starring Rick Jason
 The Cisco Kid ZIV, 1950–1956, starring Duncan Renaldo & Leo Carrillo (adapted from Ziv's original radio edition)
 The Eddie Cantor Comedy Theatre ZIV, 1955, starring Eddie Cantor
 The Man and the Challenge ZIV, 1959–1960, starring George Nader
 The Rough Riders ZIV, 1958–1959, starring Kent Taylor
 The Unexpected ZIV, 1952, Suspense anthology hosted by Herbert Marshall
 This Man Dawson ZIV, 1959–1960, starring Keith Andes
 Tombstone Territory ZIV, 1957–1960, starring Pat Conway & Richard Eastham
 The Troubleshooters ZIV, 1959–1960, starring Keenan Wynn
 Waterfront ZIV, 1954–1955, starring Preston Foster (co-produced by Roland Reed)
 West Point Story ZIV, 1956–1957, Military anthology series.
 World of Giants (aka W-O-G) ZIV, 1959 (13 episodes), starring Marshall Thompson
 Your Favorite Story ZIV, 1953–1954, anthology series hosted by Adolphe Menjou (adapted from Ziv's 1946–199 radio series, Favorite Story, hosted by Ronald Colman)

References

External links
 Encyclopedia of Television
 Ziv Television Records are part of the United Artists Records at the Wisconsin Center for Film and Theater Research. Use a Basic Search for the term ZIV. 
 Sea Hunt Trivia Guide, ZIV Television Programs from The Scuba Guy
Television production companies of the United States
Mass media companies established in 1948
1962 disestablishments
Television syndication distributors
United Artists
Former Metro-Goldwyn-Mayer subsidiaries